The FIL World Luge Championships 1975 took place in Hammarstrand, Sweden for a second time after previously hosting the championships in 1967.

Men's singles

Women's singles

Men's doubles

Medal table

References
Men's doubles World Champions
Men's singles World Champions
Women's singles World Champions

FIL World Luge Championships
1975 in luge
1975 in Swedish sport
Luge in Sweden